The Asgard Range is a mountain range in Victoria Land, Antarctica. It divides Wright Valley from Taylor Glacier and Taylor Valley, and was named by the Victoria University of Wellington Antarctic Expedition (1958–59) after Asgard, the home of the Norse gods.

Geography 
The Asgard Range contains numerous named features such as peaks, valleys, and glaciers, and even some sub-ranges. Many are named after Norse gods and mythological figures, in keeping with the name of the range itself.

Mountains 

 Ball Peak
 Mount Beowulf
 Bromley Peak
 Brunhilde Peak
 Mount Carnes
 Mount Darby
 Mount Feola
 Mount Freya
 Mount Holm-Hansen
 Mount Grendal
 Mount Hall
 Harp Hill
 Harris Peak
 Hetha Peak
 Hind Turret
 Hoehn Peak
 Hoffman Peak
 Idun Peak
 Mount Irvine
 Mount Jord
 Mount Knox
 Mount Loke
 Lyons Cone
 Matterhorn
 Mattox Bastion
 Mount Newall
 Obelisk Mountain
 Mount Odin
 Oliver Peak
 Panorama Peak
 Perk Summit
 Ponder Peak
 Mount Saga, Siegfried Peak
 Siegmund Peak
 Mount Thundergut
 Mount Thor
 Twickler Cone 
 Mount Ulla
 Utgard Peak
 Mount Valhalla
 Mount Valkyrie
 Veli Peak
 Vishniac Peak
 Vogler Peak
 Webb Peak
 Wolak Peak

Glaciers 

 Alberich Glacier
 Bartley Glacier
 Beowulf Glacier
 Conrow Glacier
 Commonwealth Glacier
 Decker Glacier
 Ferguson Glacier
 Fountain Glacier
 Godwit Glacier
 Heimdall Glacier
 Meserve Glacier
 Mime Glacier
 Newall Glacier
 Norris Glacier
 Nylen Glacier
 Repeater Glacier
 Schlatter Glacier
 Sykes Glacier
 Valhalla Glacier
 Wright Lower Glacier
 Wright Upper Glacier

Valleys 

 David Valley
 Donner Valley
 Fenrir Valley
 Hallet Valley
 Jotunheim Valley
 Koenig Valley
 Nibelungen Valley
 Njord Valley
 Pearse Valley
 Sessrumnir Valley
 Tiw Valley
 Tyrol Valley

Other features 

 Colosseum Cliff
 Flint Ridge
 Gallagher Ridge
 Hess Mesa
 Horowitz Ridge
 Hothem Cliffs
 Inland Forts
 Kottmeier Mesa
 Linnaeus Terrace
 Martin Cirque
 MacDonald Hills
 Morelli Ridge
 Mudrey Cirque
 Nichols Ridge
 Plane Table
 Pukeko Pond
 Roa Ridge
 Tractor Corner
 Unwin Ledge

Gallery

References
 

 
Mountain ranges of Victoria Land
McMurdo Dry Valleys